The 1955–1956 St. Francis Terriers men's basketball team represented St. Francis College during the 1955–56 NCAA men's basketball season. The team was coached by Daniel Lynch, who was in his eighth year at the helm of the St. Francis Terriers. The team was a member of the Metropolitan New York Conference  and played their home games at the II Corps Artillery Armory in Park Slope, Brooklyn.

The Terriers were led by Al Innis, Dan Mannix, Walt Adamushko, and Tony D'Elia in the 1955–56 season and were ranked as high as 13th nationally. The team at one point won 18 straight games and upset Niagara to reach the NIT Semi-Finals, before falling to Dayton. Also of note, Al Inniss set the St. Francis single-game rebounding record with 37 against Lafayette in the First Round of the National Invitational Tournament.

Roster

Schedule and results

|-
!colspan=12 style="background:#0038A8; border: 2px solid #CE1126;;color:#FFFFFF;"| Regular Season

                     
|-
!colspan=12 style="background:#0038A8; border: 2px solid #CE1126;;color:#FFFFFF;"| National Invitation Tournament

|-

Rankings

1956 National Invitation Tournament
Below is the 1956 National Invitation Tournament bracket. Only four of the twelve participating schools were seeded (Dayton-1, Louisville-2, Saint Joseph's-3, Niagara-4) and they received a bye in the first round. St. Francis was the only team to participate in the semifinals that was not seeded.

NBA Draft

At the end of the season Dan Mannix was selected with the 63rd overall pick by the Rochester Royals.

Awards

Alvin Innniss

All-Metropolitan Selection by the Metropolitan Basketball Writers’ Association.
Daniel Mannix

All-Metropolitan Selection by the Metropolitan Basketball Writers’ Association.

References

External links
 St. Francis Terriers men's basketball official website

St. Francis Brooklyn Terriers men's basketball seasons
St. Francis
St. Francis
Saint Francis
Saint Francis